Live at McCabe's is an album of American guitarist Norman Blake and Nancy Blake, released in 1975. It was recorded at McCabe's Guitar Shop in Santa Monica, California.

Live at McCabe's was reissued on CD in 1987 along with Directions by Takoma.

Reception

In his Allmusic review, critic Jim Smith wrote "Long cherished by Norman Blake's fans as one of the greatest flatpicking albums of all time, Live at McCabe's isn't as essential as some of the guitarist's studio records of the time (see Whiskey Before Breakfast), but there's a warm, ramshackle beauty about this concert that is every bit as charming."

Track listing
"Introduction By Nancy Covey" – 0:38
"Nine Pound Hammer" (Merle Travis) – 4:07
"Sweet Heaven When I Die" (Grant) – 3:59
"Introducing Nancy Blake" – 1:10
"Border Widow" (Blake) – 2:10
""G" Medley: Green Leaf Fancy/Fields of November/Fort Smith" (Blake, Traditional) – 5:35
"Dry Grass on the High Fields" (Blake) – 2:35
"John Hardy" (Traditional) – 5:24
"Arkansas Traveler" (Traditional) – 2:26
"Medley: Bully of the Town/Bonaparte's Retreat/Richland Avenue Rag" (Traditional) – 3:22
"Harvey's Reel" (Blake) – 2:00

Personnel
Norman Blake – guitar, fiddle, vocals
Nancy Blake – cello
Production notes
Doug Decker – producer, engineer
Kirk Felton – remastering
Absalom Jackson – art direction, original cover artwork
Jon Monday – art direction, original cover artwork
Jamie Putnam – art direction
Deb Sibony – design

References

Norman Blake (American musician) albums
1975 live albums
Takoma Records live albums